"Zingara" (Italian for Gypsy woman) is a song composed by Enrico Riccardi and Luigi Albertelli. The song won the nineteenth edition of the Sanremo Music Festival 1969, with a double performance by Bobby Solo and Iva Zanicchi. The Solo's version  peaked at first place  for two weeks on the Italian hit parade.
 
The song also named a musicarello film with the same name, directed by Mariano Laurenti and starred by the same Bobby Solo and by Loretta Goggi.

Track listing

Bobby Solo Version 
 7" single – SRL 10-527  
 "Zingara"  (Enrico Riccardi, Luigi Albertelli)
 "Piccola ragazza triste" (Cesare Gigli, Gianni Sanjust, Capuano, Bobby Solo)

Iva Zanicchi Version 
  7" single – REN NP 16327 
 "Zingara"  (Enrico Riccardi, Luigi Albertelli)
 "Io Sogno" (Salvatore Vinciguerra)

References

1969 singles
Italian songs
Number-one singles in Italy
1969 songs
Sanremo Music Festival songs
Bobby Solo songs
Ricordi Dischi singles
Songs written by Luigi Albertelli